Sai krok Isan is a fermented sausage originating from the Lao living in the northeastern provinces of Thailand. It is made with pork and rice, and typically eaten as a snack served with bird's eye chilis, raw cabbage, and sliced ginger.

See also

 Sai gork
 Naem – a fermented pork sausage in Thai cuisine
 Lao sausage – a broad term used to describe the local variant of Lao style sausages found in Laos, Northern and Northeastern Thailand
 List of sausages

References

Thai sausages
Isan cuisine